Víctor Alfonso Guzmán Guzmán (born 3 February 1995), also known as Pocho, is a Mexican professional footballer who plays as a midfielder for Liga MX club Guadalajara.

Club career

Pachuca
Guzmán joined Guadalajara's youth academy in 2012. In June 2015, it was announced Guzmán was sent out on loan to Pachuca for one year. He made his professional debut on 11 August 2015 against Monterrey. He scored his first goal on 23 January 2016 in a 4–1 away win against Club América at the Estadio Azteca.

On 29 May 2016, after entering the match as a 66th minute substitute, Guzmán scored the Clausura 2016 championship-clinching goal with a header against Monterrey at the Estadio BBVA Bancomer to tie the match 1–1 in the second leg, giving Pachuca the 2–1 aggregate victory and their sixth Liga MX title. In December 2016, Guzmán joined Pachuca permanently from Guadalajara in a deal which saw Rodolfo Pizarro move the other way.

On 18 August 2017, Guzmán scored his first goal and brace of the 2017–18 season against Morelia resulting in a 2–1 victory. Four days later, he would score another brace and contribute one assist in a 4–1 victory over Veracruz. He scored another brace the following month in a 4–0 win over Cruz Azul. He ended the Apertura 2017 as the highest scoring Mexican goalscorer with eight goals, and was included in the Best XI of the Apertura. On 9 December, in the FIFA Club World Cup quarter-final match against Wydad Casablanca, Guzmán scored the winning goal in extra-time.

On 27 January 2018, during the fourth match day of the  Clausura 2018 against Tigres UANL, Guzmán suffered an anterior cruciate ligament injury that caused him to be sidelined for six months, missing out on the rest of the tournament and the chance to be called up by Mexico to play at the 2018 FIFA World Cup.

Following his ACL injury, Guzmán would return to the fields on 22 July 2018 for the 2018–19 season as a starter in a 1–0 loss against Monterrey. On 18 August, in a league match against Lobos BUAP, he would come on as a substitute at half-time, contributing an assist and scoring himself as Pachuca won the match 3–0. On 21 August, he scored the equalizing goal in a 1–1 draw against Morelia. On 29 September, he provided all of the assists in Pachuca's 3–1 win over Cruz Azul; Guzmán was subsequently named Man of the Match. On 3 November, he scored four goals against Necaxa in a 6–2 home victory, becoming the youngest Mexican player to score four goals in the Liga MX, and the first since Javier Orozco in 2015. He finished the Apertura 2018 as third-joint scorer of the league with 9 goals, he was also listed in the Best XI of the Apertura 2018.

Doping Case
On 12 December 2019, after much media speculation, Guzmán was announced as Guadalajara's newest signing. Right before the season started, a drug test from the previous season surfaced that Guzmán had drugs in his system, and Guadalajara canceled the agreement they had with Pachuca. Guzmán claims the tests are false and awaits legal action as a Pachuca player.

Return to Pachuca
On 24 August 2020, 10 months since his last match, he returned to the playing field in a league match against Mazatlán, scoring the winning goal from a penalty kick during stoppage time, giving his team a 4–3 victory.

International career

Youth
Guzmán was called up to the under-20 team by Sergio Almaguer for the 2015 CONCACAF U-20 Championship in Jamaica. He played five matches and scored the third goal in a 3–0 victory group stage match against Honduras. Mexico would go on winning the tournament. Guzmán was then called up to participate in the 2015 FIFA U-20 World Cup with Mexico in New Zealand, where he would appear in all three group stage matches but Mexico would finish last in the group.

On 18 September 2015, Guzmán was selected by coach Raúl Gutierrez to play in the 2015 CONCACAF Olympic Qualifying Championship. Going on to appear in all games, he scored the last goal of the final in a 2–0 victory over Honduras. He would go on to be listed in the tournament's Best XI.

On 7 July 2016, Guzmán was named in Mexico's 23-man squad that would participate in the 2016 Summer Olympics in Rio de Janeiro, Brazil. He would only make one appearance, being substituted in at the 83rd minute for Pachuca teammate Hirving Lozano as Mexico tied 2–2 in their first group stage match against Germany.

Senior
Guzmán made his debut with the senior national team on 7 September 2018 in a friendly match against Uruguay in a 4–1 loss, coming on for Erick Gutiérrez at the 60th minute, managing to contribute an audacious overhead kick that hit the post. On 11 October, he scored his first international goal in a 3–2 friendly win against Costa Rica at the Estadio Universitario, the same stadium where he suffered his season-ending injury in January 2018.

Style of play
Guzmán began his career as a defensive midfielder but Diego Alonso, manager of Pachuca at the time, opted to turn him into a versatile player capable of playing anywhere in midfield, as well as a wing-back and striker. He is described as a "midfielder displaying physicality, good individual technique, and having a constant link with the back of the net," "offers speed, the ability to create attacks and also kill off opposing advances when needed," as well as possessing "an excellent awareness of space and the way he times his runs into the penalty area appears to be an innate gift." When playing with Pachuca, he starts off as a central box-to-box midfielder and as the game rolls on, when Pachuca builds its attacks from the wings, Guzman sneaks to the middle with ease, taking advantage of defenders who aren't expecting him to drift forward.

His playing style has drawn comparisons with fellow Mexico international Héctor Herrera.

Career statistics

Club

International

International goals

Honours
Pachuca
Liga MX: Clausura 2016, Apertura 2022
CONCACAF Champions League: 2016–17

Mexico Youth
CONCACAF U-20 Championship:  2015
CONCACAF Olympic Qualifying Championship: 2015

Individual
CONCACAF Olympic Qualifying Championship Best XI: 2015
Liga MX Best XI: Apertura 2017, Apertura 2018, Clausura 2022
Liga MX All-Star: 2022

References

External links
 
 
 
 
 

1995 births
Living people
Mexican footballers
Mexico youth international footballers
Mexico under-20 international footballers
Association football midfielders
Liga MX players
C.F. Pachuca players
Footballers from Guadalajara, Jalisco
Footballers at the 2016 Summer Olympics
Olympic footballers of Mexico
2015 CONCACAF U-20 Championship players